State Highway 22 (SH 22) is a New Zealand state highway just south of Auckland. It connects the town of Pukekohe to the Auckland Southern Motorway.

Route
The route begins at Exit 461 on  near Drury and travels in a general south-west direction along Karaka Road, and then south to Pukekohe. The highway officially terminates where SH 22 meets the northern intersection with Adams Drive. From there the road changes to Edinburgh Street and continues into Pukekohe town centre.

Major intersections

History

This section was revoked circa 1990 although much of the original route still holds the name "Highway 22".

Metalling of the southern Te Uku-Waingaro section, to what is now SH 23, was completed in 1937. In 1944 what was to become State Highway 22 was expected to become an arterial road linking Auckland and New Plymouth. That was long before the National Roads Board, gazetted it as State Highway 22 in July 1963, which designation was first shown on a one-inch map in 1971.

A start was made on upgrading the road to the SH 23 junction near Te Uku in the early 1960s. 85% of the cost (£75,000 in 1961 – $3.3m at 2017 prices) was paid by the National Roads Board.

See also
 List of New Zealand state highways

References

External links
New Zealand Transport Agency

22
Transport in the Auckland Region